Ng Eain Yow (born 26 January 1998 in Kuala Lumpur) is a Malaysian professional squash player. As of December 2020, he was ranked number 26 in the world.

References

1998 births
Living people
Malaysian male squash players
Malaysian people of Chinese descent
Squash players at the 2018 Commonwealth Games
Commonwealth Games competitors for Malaysia
Asian Games medalists in squash
Squash players at the 2018 Asian Games
Asian Games gold medalists for Malaysia
Medalists at the 2018 Asian Games
21st-century Malaysian people